Group B of the 2002 Fed Cup Americas Zone Group I was one of two pools in the Americas Zone Group I of the 2002 Fed Cup. Four teams competed in a round robin competition, with the top teams coming first and second advancing to the play-offs, and the bottom team being relegated down to 2003 Group II.

Colombia vs. Venezuela

Uruguay vs. Paraguay

Colombia vs. Uruguay

Brazil vs. Venezuela

Colombia vs. Paraguay

Uruguay vs. Brazil

Uruguay vs. Venezuela

Paraguay vs. Brazil

Colombia vs. Brazil

Paraguay vs. Venezuela

  failed to win any ties in the pool, and thus was relegated to Group II in 2003. However, they did not partake in the Fed Cup next year.

See also
Fed Cup structure

References

External links
 Fed Cup website

2002 Fed Cup Americas Zone